Arenshausen is a village in the Eichsfeld district of Thuringia, Germany.

References

Eichsfeld (district)